Tsovasar is a village in the Martuni Municipality of the Gegharkunik Province of Armenia.

Etymology 
The village was previously known as Tazakend.

History 
The town contains a church, dedicated to St. Grigor Lusavorich, dating to the 9th century, and a 16th-century St. Astavatsatsin church.

Gallery

References

External links 

 
 
 

Populated places in Gegharkunik Province